Solidarity is a unity of purpose or togetherness.

Solidarity may also refer to:

Literature 
 Solidarity (newspaper), a newspaper published by the Alliance for Workers Liberty in the United Kingdom
 Solidarity (U.S. newspaper), a newspaper published by the Industrial Workers of the World
 Solidarity, a monthly magazine published by the United Auto Workers

Music 
 Solidarity (Richard Clapton album) (1984)
 Solidarity (Joel Plaskett album), a 2017 album by Joel Plaskett and Bill Plaskett
 Solidarity, a 2012 album by The Souljazz Orchestra
 "Solidarity Song", a 1931 song by Bertolt Brecht and Hanns Eisler
 "Solidarity", a song by Angelic Upstarts
 "Solidarity", a song from Billy Elliot the Musical, written by Elton John and Lee Hall
 "Solidarity", a song by Black Uhuru
 "Solidarity", a song by Disrupt
 "Solidarity", a song by Enter Shikari
 "Solidarity", a song by Five Iron Frenzy from All the Hype That Money Can Buy
 "Solidarity," a song by Rancid

Politics

Political parties 
 Solidarity (Iceland), a political party in Iceland
 Solidarity (Ireland), a socialist party, formerly the Anti-Austerity Alliance
 Solidarity (Scotland), a breakaway from the Scottish Socialist Party in September 2006
 Solidarity (Switzerland), a political party in Switzerland
 Solidarity (Ukraine) or Bloc of Petro Poroshenko, a political party in Ukraine
 Solidarity Party (Illinois), an American political party founded by Adlai Stevenson III in Illinois

Other political organisations 
 Solidarity (Australia), an Australian Trotskyist organisation
 Solidarity (UK), a libertarian socialist organisation in the United Kingdom 1960-1992
 Solidarity (U.S.), a United States political organization formed by the fusion of the International Socialists, Socialist Unity, and Workers' Power

Trade unions 
 Solidarity (Polish trade union)
 Solidarity (South African trade union)
 Solidarity (British trade union)

Other uses 
 Solidarity (Catholic theology), a Catholic Social Teaching and Christian virtue

See also
 American Solidarity Party, a Christian democratic political party in the United States
 Atassut, a political party in Greenland
 Cornish Solidarity, a cross-party organisation fighting for 'Cornish Rights'
 Indonesian Solidarity Party, a progressive and feminist political party in Indonesia
 La Solidaridad, a 19th-century Filipino propagandist group
 Solidaridad, Quintana Roo, Mexican municipality
 Solidariedade, a political party in Brazil
 Solidarism (disambiguation)
 Operation Solidarity, a protest movement in Vancouver, British Columbia in 1983
 "Solidarity Forever", an anthem of the leftist and trade-union movements
 Solidarity - Kosovo is Serbia, a Serbian media campaign
 Solidarity Movement with Chile, a political movement in Chile, 1972–1990
 Solidarity Youth Movement, a youth movement based in Kerala, India
 Solidarnost, a modern Russian opposition movement